Jaroslav Flegr (born 12 March 1958) is a Czech parasitologist, evolutionary biologist, and author of the book Frozen Evolution. He is professor of biology at the Faculty of Science, Charles University in Prague, and is a member of the editorial board of the journal Neuroendocrinology Letters.

His work on how toxoplasmosis—an infection caused by the protozoan parasite T. gondii—influences personality, sex ratios, and rates of traffic accidents, has received coverage in The Atlantic, Salon, and The Guardian. Flegr maintains that toxoplasmosis might increase the rate of traffic accidents by as much as one million collisions per year. He also believes that T. gondii contributes to suicides and mental disorders such as schizophrenia.

Frozen Evolution
Frozen Evolution is a popular science book which aims to explain current developments in evolutionary biology to a wide audience. It also contains information boxes which clarify important topics in science like peer review, scientific journals, citation metrics, philosophy of science, paradigm shifts, and Occam's razor. Flegr's previous research in toxoplasmosis is also mentioned. 

The book also discusses Flegr's model of frozen plasticity, a hypothesis that describes a possible mechanism for the origin of adaptive traits. This hypothesis proposes that natural selection can only explain adaptation in limited conditions, for example when populations are genetically homogeneous. He describes frozen plasticity as being more general, and maintains that it better explains the origin of adaptive traits in genetically heterogeneous populations of sexual reproducing organisms. His hypothesis of frozen plasticity is an extension of Niles Eldredge and Stephen Jay Gould's theory of punctuated equilibria, which describes the history of most fossil species as being relatively stable for millions of years, later punctuated by swift periods of evolutionary change during speciation.

Bibliography
 (Czech version only in print)
 (Czech version only in print)
 Folia Parasitologica  46 (May): 22–28.

References

External links
 Prof. RNDr. Jaroslav Flegr, CSc.
 Frozen Revolution – Official book website
 How Your Cat Is Making You Crazy – The Atlantic

Living people
1958 births
Czech biologists
Czech parasitologists
Extended evolutionary synthesis
Evolutionary biologists
Charles University alumni